Netherlands competed at the 2019 World Athletics Championships in Doha, Qatar, from 27 October to 6 October 2019. 30 athletes were selected to compete for the Netherlands.

Medalists

Results

Men
Track and road events

Field events

Combined events – Decathlon

Women
Track and road events

Field events

Combined events – Heptathlon

References

Nations at the 2019 World Athletics Championships
World Championships in Athletics
Netherlands at the World Championships in Athletics